North Dakota Highway 210 (ND 210) is a  east–west state highway in the U.S. state of North Dakota. It serves as a bypass of Wahpeton.

Route description

The route begins at an interchange with Highway 13 west of Wahpeton. It travels north from there before heading east. It then crosses the Red River and into Minnesota, where it runs into its eastern terminus with MN-210 in Breckenridge.

Major intersections

Gallery

Notes

External links
The North Dakota Highways Page by Chris Geelhart

210